Fridhemsplan metro station is a station of the Stockholm metro, located in the district of Kungsholmen. The station is entirely underground and provides an interchange between the Blue and Green lines. There are two platforms for each line, about a hundred metres apart.

To the south-west of the station a tunnel between the blue and green lines provides the only connection for trains to be moved onto and off the blue line.

The green line platforms were opened on 26 October 1952 as a part of the stretch between Hötorget and Vällingby. and are around  under the ground. The second part was opened on 31 August 1975 as part the first stretch of the Blue Line between T-Centralen and Hjulsta. The trains were running via Hallonbergen and Rinkeby. The blue line platform is around 28–31 meters under the ground.

Gallery

References

External links
Images of Fridhemsplan

Green line (Stockholm metro) stations
Blue line (Stockholm metro) stations
Railway stations opened in 1952